USS S-51 (SS-162) was a fourth-group (S-48) S-class submarine of the United States Navy. Her keel was laid down on 22 December 1919 by the Lake Torpedo Boat Company of Bridgeport, Connecticut. She was launched on 20 August 1921 sponsored by Mrs. R.J. Mills, and commissioned on 24 June 1922.

Operations
The new submarine was based at New London, Connecticut on 1 July 1922 as a unit of Submarine Division 4 (SubDiv 4) and followed a normal peacetime training cycle, operating out of her home port with visits to Newport, Rhode Island, and Providence, Rhode Island. She departed from New York City on 4 January 1924 for the Panama Canal Zone to participate in winter fleet maneuvers off Panama and in the Caribbean Sea. During this cruise, she visited Trinidad, Guantanamo Bay, Culebra, and St. Thomas, Virgin Islands. After returning to New York City on 30 April, she resumed type training off Block Island and in New England coastal waters.

Sinking
On the night of 25 September 1925, S-51 was operating on the surface near Block Island, with her running lights on. The merchant steamer City of Rome spotted a single white masthead light but was unable to determine its course, speed, or intentions. The ship altered her course away from the unknown light to give whatever it might be greater leeway.  Meanwhile, S-51 spotted the ship's masthead and green sidelights, and held her course as she was required to do by the Rules of the Road then in effect. Shortly after altering course, City of Rome spotted the submarine's red sidelight and realized that they were on collision courses.  She turned and backed her engines, but it was too late. Twenty-two minutes after first spotting the submarine's masthead light, the steamer rammed her at the position .

Only three, (Dewey G. Kile, Michael E. Lira, and Alfred Geier) of the 36 men in the submarine were able to abandon ship before she sank.

The courts found City of Rome at fault for not reducing her speed when in doubt as to the movement of S-51, and for not signaling her change of course. However, both the district court and the Circuit Court of Appeals found S-51 at fault for having improper lights.

The United States Navy argued that it was not practicable to have submarines of this class comply with the letter of the law, and that, as a special type of warship, S-51 was under no legal compulsion to do so. The court responded by saying if these statements were correct, then submarines "should confine their operation to waters not being traversed by other ships."

Salvage

S-51 was raised on 5 July 1926 by a team led by then-Lieutenant Commander (later Rear Admiral) Edward Ellsberg. The entire salvage operation was commanded by Captain (later Fleet Admiral) Ernest J. King. She was struck from the Naval Vessel Register on 27 January 1930 and sold for scrap on 23 June to the Borough Metal Company of Brooklyn, New York. S-51'''s bell was removed and taken to the Submarine Force Library & Museum at Groton, Connecticut.

In Culture
The sinking of USS S-51 is memorialized in the popular song, "Sinking of the Submarine S-51," by Maggie Andrews. For solo guitar and mouth harp accompaniment, the song was recorded by tenor Al Craver (pseudonym for Vernon Dalhart) on Columbia 78 RPM record 15044-D (141099), on October 9, 1925.

References

Further reading
Ellsberg, Edward. "Report on Salvage Operations: Submarine S-51". Navy Department: United States Government Printing Office, 1927.
 _. On the Bottom. New York: The Literary Guild of America, Inc, 1929. .

External links
The S-51 Memorial web site
On Eternal Patrol: USS S-51
NavSource Online: Submarine Photo Archive S-51 (SS-162)
"COURAGE!" Popular Mechanics'', March 1933 – detailed article on salvage operation

Ships built in Bridgeport, Connecticut
S-51
S-51, USS
United States submarine accidents
Submarines sunk in collisions
Maritime incidents in 1925
1921 ships
Shipwrecks of the Rhode Island coast